Junction 18 was a punk rock band out of Abington, Massachusetts from 1995 – 2006 signed to Fearless Records.

History
Junction 18 toured all the United States and Canada with bands such as New Found Glory, Midtown, Piebald, Big in Japan, Simple Plan, The Receiving End of Sirens, Hot Rod Circuit, The Stryder, Dynamite Boy, Smackin Isiah, Plain White T's, Brazil, BigWig and many more.

After performing as part of the Vans Warped Tour, the band was signed by Fearless Records who released the debut album This Vicious Cycle in 2000. The Heroes from the Future EP followed in 2002, with the split album with Over It, The Acoustic Split, released in 2003. In the same year, they were featured on the tribute album Smoking Popes Tribute. In 2004, it was announced that work had started on a new album, with eventual hopes to have it released sometime in Summer 2005. However, its release was ultimately canceled due to unknown reasons.

Past members of the band were Chris Kelley (drums), Andy Bristol (vocals), Ryan Spencer (bass), Nick Mele (bass), Scott Morganella (guitar),  Ryan McHugh (guitar), Ricky Cardona (guitar/bass),  John Menton Jr (guitar), and Jeff Lavallee (guitar).

The original lineup reunited to play a three-song set at A Loss For Words' final show at the Palladium in Worcester MA on December 27, 2015.

Discography

Albums
This Vicious Cycle (2000), Fearless
The Acoustic Split (2003), Top Notch - with Over It

EPs
Heroes from the Future (2002), Fearless

References

External links
Fearless Records

Musical groups disestablished in 2006
Musical groups established in 1995
Pop punk groups from Massachusetts
Punk rock groups from Massachusetts
Fearless Records artists